Ridgecrest is a small town in Concordia Parish, Louisiana, United States. The population was 694 at the 2010 census.

Geography
Ridgecrest is located in northeastern Concordia Parish at  (31.602857, -91.527950). The Mississippi state line is less than a mile northeast of Ridgecrest in a former channel of the Mississippi River known as Marengo Bend.

Demographics

As of the census of 2000, there were 801 people, 291 households, and 229 families residing in the town. The racial makeup of the town was 93.51% White, 5.49% African American, 0.87% Native American, 0.12% from other races. Hispanic or Latino of any race were 1.37% of the population.

There were 291 households, out of which 28.9% had children under the age of 18 living with them, 60.8% were married couples living together, 12.0% had a female householder with no husband present, and 21.0% were non-families. 17.9% of all households were made up of individuals, and 10.0% had someone living alone who was 65 years of age or older. The average household size was 2.60 and the average family size was 2.95.

In the town, the population was spread out, with 21.5% under the age of 18, 9.9% from 18 to 24, 25.0% from 25 to 44, 25.7% from 45 to 64, and 18.0% who were 65 years of age or older. The median age was 41 years. For every 100 females, there were 95.4 males. For every 100 females age 18 and over, there were 88.9 males.

The median income for a household in the town was $31,000, and the median income for a family was $32,917. Males had a median income of $30,625 versus $20,114 for females. The per capita income for the town was $14,629. About 17.8% of families and 21.7% of the population were below the poverty line, including 33.9% of those under age 18 and 10.0% of those age 65 or over.

References

External links
 Ridgecrest Progress Community Progress Site for Ridgecrest, LA

Towns in Louisiana
Towns in Concordia Parish, Louisiana
Towns in Natchez micropolitan area